The March 1679 English general election resulted in the  Habeas Corpus Parliament, named after the Habeas Corpus Act, which it enacted in May, 1679 to define and strengthen the ancient prerogative writ benefitting all subjects. It was dissolved while in recess on 12 July 1679. 

On the current issue of excluding the King's younger brother from the sucession to the throne, 218 members were in favour of the Exclusion Bill, while 137 were opposed. However, 167 members did not attend the parliament at all, so their view about Exclusion is unknown.

References

External links

17th-century elections in Europe
1679 in politics
1679 in England
Elections to the Parliament of England